Fluprednidene, also known as fluprednylidene, is a synthetic glucocorticoid corticosteroid which was never marketed. An acetate ester of fluprednidene, fluprednidene acetate, in contrast, has been marketed.

References

Diketones
Fluoroarenes
Glucocorticoids
Pregnanes
Triols
Vinylidene compounds